The following is a timeline of the history of the city of Córdoba, Andalusia, Spain.

Prior to 20th century

 152 BCE – Romans in power.
 45 BCE – Battle of Munda occurs near Cordoba.
 294 CE – Hosius becomes bishop.
 554 CE – Byzantines in power.
 571 – Visigoth Liuvigild in power.
 719 – Capital of al-Andalus relocated to Cordoba from Seville.
 785 – Great Mosque of Córdoba built.
 880 – Earthquake.
 929 – Umayyad Abd-ar-Rahman III becomes Caliph of Córdoba.
 936 – Madinat Al-Zahra construction begins.
 1009 – Civil war begins.
 1236 – Mosque converted into Cathedral of Córdoba.
 1315 – Synagogue founded (approximate date).
 1857 – Population: 42,909.

20th century

 1910 – Population: 66,831.
 1930 – Population: 103,106.
 1979 – Julio Anguita becomes mayor.
 1981 – Population: 284,737.

21st century

 2008 – Population: 325,453.
 2011 –  becomes mayor.

See also
 
 
 
 Timelines of other cities in the autonomous community of Andalusia: Timeline of Almería, Timeline of Cádiz, Timeline of Granada, Timeline of Jaén, Timeline of Jerez de la Frontera, Timeline of Málaga, Timeline of Seville
 List of municipalities in Andalusia

References

Bibliography
Published in the 19th century
 

Published in the 20th century
 
 

 
 
 
 
 

Published in the 21st century

External links

 
 Europeana. Items related to Córdoba, various dates.
 Digital Public Library of America. Items related to Córdoba, various dates

 
cordoba